Hermann Tamussino (15 December 1898 – 23 April 1969) was an Austrian architect. His work was part of the architecture event in the art competition at the 1932 Summer Olympics.

References

1898 births
1969 deaths
20th-century Austrian architects
Olympic competitors in art competitions
People from Mödling